The Meghalaya Legislative Assembly consistencies. Meghalaya Legislative Assembly was unicameral legislature of the Indian state of Meghalaya.

The seat of the Legislative Assembly is at Vidhana Bhavan in Shillong, the capital of the state. The term of the Legislative Assembly is five years, unless dissolved earlier. Presently, it comprises 60 members who are directly elected from single-seat constituencies.

List of constituencies

References

Meghalaya-related lists

Meghalaya